Unión Deportiva Ibiza-Eivissa was a Spanish football team based in Ibiza Town, in the autonomous community of the Balearic Islands. Founded in 1995, it last played in Regional de Ibiza, holding home matches at Estadi Municipal de Can Misses, with a capacity of 10,000 seats.

History
Unión Deportiva Ibiza-Eivissa was founded in 1995, after merging with another club in the area, Sociedad Deportiva Ibiza, which folded two years after. Subsequently, the team was renamed Club Esportiu Eivissa, going on to spend nine consecutive seasons in the fourth division, and experiencing another name change in 2001.

On 4 August 2009, Eivissa suffered two consecutive relegations, after having competed for the first time in Segunda División B (2007–09), being demoted to the regional leagues. In October, the club was acquired by an Italian group.

In mid-May 2010, Ibiza-Eivissa was liquidated by the management board due to a €1.000.000 debt. At the time, the club did not have a chairman or a board of directors.

Club background
Sociedad Deportiva Ibiza (1956–97)
Unión Deportiva Ibiza (1995–97)
Club Esportiu Eivissa (1997–2001)
Sociedad Deportiva Eivissa (2001–07)
Societat Esportiva Eivissa-Ibiza (2007–09)
Unión Deportiva Ibiza-Eivissa (2009–10)
Unión Deportiva Ibiza (2015–)
Source:

Season to season

2 seasons in Segunda División B
8 seasons in Tercera División
4 seasons in Categorías Regionales

Famous players
 Jonan García
 Kirian Ledesma
 Javi Moreno
 Josep Antoni Gomes

Club anthem
(Crit de: "UC!")

Eivissa!, Eivissa!, Eivissa!

Quan s'Eivissa surt as camp
tot s'estadi es torna un clam
endavant vermell i blanc
s'afició amb valtros està.

Com corsaris mos farem
en es camp, hi lluitarem
amb honor i lleialtat
visca sa nostra ciutat!

Port s'Eivissa dins es cor
port s'Eivissa a sa sang
a l'Eivissa, es meu Eivissa,
mai el podré oblidar.

Eivissa!, Eivissa!, Eivissa!

Sigues ràpid com es vent
lluita fort sempre valent
esportiu i combatant
fes des joc un sentiment.

Porta alt es nostro nom
que s'escolti amb gran ressò
dus es nom de sa ciutat
força Eivissa, hem de guanyar!

Port s'Eivissa dins es cor
port s'Eivissa a sa sang
a s'Eivissa, es meu Eivissa
mai el podré jo oblidar.

Eivissa!, Eivissa!, Eivissa!

See also
 SE Eivissa-Ibiza B

References

External links

Unofficial website 

Sport in Ibiza
Association football clubs established in 1995
Association football clubs disestablished in 2010
Defunct football clubs in the Balearic Islands
1995 establishments in Spain
2010 disestablishments in Spain